Fabinyi is a Hungarian surname. Notable people with the surname include:
 Andrew Fabinyi (1908–1978), Hungarian-born Australian publisher
 Martin Fabinyi, Australian film and television producer and director, songwriter and screenwriter
 Tihamér Fabinyi (1890–1953), Hungarian politician

See also
 Teofil Fabiny

Hungarian-language surnames